Deianira, Deïanira, or Deianeira (or), also known as Dejanira, is a Calydonian princess in Greek mythology whose name translates as "man-destroyer" or "destroyer of her husband". She was the wife of Heracles and, in late Classical accounts, his unwitting murderer, killing him with the poisoned Shirt of Nessus. She is the main character in Sophocles' play Women of Trachis.

Family 
Deianira was the daughter of Althaea and her husband Oeneus (whose name means "wine-man"), the king of Calydon (after the wine-god gave the king the vine to cultivate), and the half-sister of Meleager. Her other siblings were Toxeus, Clymenus, Periphas, Agelaus (or Ageleus), Thyreus (or Phereus or Pheres), Gorge, Eurymede and Melanippe.

In some accounts, Deianira was the daughter of King Dexamenus of Olenus and thus, sister to Eurypylus, Theronice and Theraephone. Others called this daughter of Dexamenus as Mnesimache or Hippolyte.

Deianira was the mother of Onites, Hyllus, Glenus, Onites, Ctesippus, and Macaria, who saved the Athenians from defeat by Eurystheus.

Mythology and Literature

Marriage 

In Sophocles' account of Deianira's marriage, she was courted by the river god Achelous but saved from having to marry him by Heracles, who defeated Achelous in a wrestling contest for her hand in marriage.

In another version of the tale where she was described as the daughter of Dexamenus, Heracles raped her and promised to come back and marry her. While he was away, the centaur Eurytion appeared and demanded her as his wife. Her father, being afraid, agreed, but Heracles returned before the marriage and slew the centaur and claimed his bride.

Deianira was associated with combat, and was described as someone who "drove a chariot and practiced the art of war."

Death of Heracles 
The central story about Deianira concerns the Shirt of Nessus. A wild centaur named Nessus attempted to kidnap or rape Deianira as he was ferrying her across the river Euenos, but she was rescued by Heracles, who shot the centaur with a poisoned arrow. As he lay dying, Nessus persuaded Deianira to take a sample of his blood, telling her that a potion of it mixed with olive oil would ensure that Heracles would never again be unfaithful.

Deianira believed his words and kept a little of the potion by her. Heracles fathered illegitimate children all across Greece and then fell in love with Iole. When Deianira thus feared that her husband would leave her forever, she smeared some of the blood on Heracles' famous lionskin shirt.  Heracles' servant, Lichas, brought him the shirt and he put it on. The centaur's toxic blood burned Heracles terribly, and eventually, he threw himself into a funeral pyre. In despair, Deianira committed suicide by hanging herself or with a sword.

Middle Age tradition 
She is remembered in De Mulieribus Claris, a collection of biographies of historical and mythological women by the Florentine author Giovanni Boccaccio, composed in 136162. It is notable as the first collection devoted exclusively to biographies of women in Western literature.

Calydonian family tree

Notes

References

Primary sources 
 Antoninus Liberalis, The Metamorphoses of Antoninus Liberalis translated by Francis Celoria (Routledge 1992). Online version at the Topos Text Project.
Apollodorus, The Library with an English Translation by Sir James George Frazer, F.B.A., F.R.S. in 2 Volumes, Cambridge, MA, Harvard University Press; London, William Heinemann Ltd. 1921. ISBN 0-674-99135-4. Online version at the Perseus Digital Library. Greek text available from the same website.
Diodorus Siculus, The Library of History translated by Charles Henry Oldfather. Twelve volumes. Loeb Classical Library. Cambridge, Massachusetts: Harvard University Press; London: William Heinemann, Ltd. 1989. Vol. 3. Books 4.59–8. Online version at Bill Thayer's Web Site
Diodorus Siculus, Bibliotheca Historica. Vol 1-2. Immanel Bekker. Ludwig Dindorf. Friedrich Vogel. in aedibus B. G. Teubneri. Leipzig. 1888-1890. Greek text available at the Perseus Digital Library.
Gaius Julius Hyginus, Fabulae from The Myths of Hyginus translated and edited by Mary Grant. University of Kansas Publications in Humanistic Studies. Online version at the Topos Text Project.
Hesiod, Catalogue of Women from Homeric Hymns, Epic Cycle, Homerica translated by Evelyn-White, H G. Loeb Classical Library Volume 57. London: William Heinemann, 1914. Online version at theio.com
Hesiod, Catalogue of Women fr. 2 5
 Ovid, Heroides 9
 Ovid, Metamorphoses 9.101-238
Pausanias, Description of Greece with an English Translation by W.H.S. Jones, Litt.D., and H.A. Ormerod, M.A., in 4 Volumes. Cambridge, MA, Harvard University Press; London, William Heinemann Ltd. 1918. . Online version at the Perseus Digital Library
Pausanias, Graeciae Descriptio. 3 vols. Leipzig, Teubner. 1903.  Greek text available at the Perseus Digital Library.

Secondary sources 
Peck, Harry Thurston, Harper's Dictionary of Classical Antiquities. New York. Harper and Brothers. 1898
 Graves, Robert, The Greek Myths, 1955, 142.ff, 142.2,3,5
Graves, Robert, The Greek Myths: The Complete and Definitive Edition. Penguin Books Limited. 2017.

External links

Princesses in Greek mythology
Family of Calyce
Women of Heracles
Children of Dionysus
Demigods in classical mythology
Metamorphoses characters
Aetolian characters in Greek mythology
Suicides in Greek mythology
Greek feminine given names